Adriano Aparecido Narcizo (born 30 August 1994), simply known as Adriano, is a Brazilian professional footballer who plays as a forward for Malaysia Super League club Penang.

Club career

Melaka United
On 27 May 2021, Adriano signed a contract with Malaysian club Melaka United. On 25 July 2021, he made his debut for the club in a 1–1 draw against Sri Pahang.

Penang FC
In February 2023, he joined Penang FC. He played as starting midfielder in a pre-season cup match against Selangor FC and won the Hope Cup.

References

External links

1994 births
Living people
Footballers from São Paulo (state)
Brazilian footballers
Association football forwards
Grêmio Novorizontino players
Rio Branco Football Club players
Ipatinga Futebol Clube players
Malaysia Super League players
Melaka United F.C. players
Penang F.C. players
Brazilian expatriate footballers
Brazilian expatriate sportspeople in Malaysia
Expatriate footballers in Malaysia